Varano Borghi is a comune (municipality) in the Province of Varese in the Italian region Lombardy, located about  northwest of Milan and about  southwest of Varese.

Varano Borghi borders the following municipalities: Casale Litta, Comabbio, Inarzo, Mercallo, Ternate, Vergiate.

Demographic evolution

References

Cities and towns in Lombardy